RedeTV! News is the main newscast of RedeTV! anchored by Mauro Tagliaferri and Gabriela Di França. It focuses on major events in Brazil and the world.

The superintendent of journalism and sports is the journalist Franz Vacek.

Correspondents 
 Clarissa Rossi (Barcelona)
 Eliseu Caetano (Miami)
 Erika Abreu (Londres)
 Fábio Borges (Los Angeles)
 Luciana Tadeo (Buenos Aires)
 Marcelo Espíndola (Kong Kong)
 Peterson Izidoro (Lisboa)
 Renato Senise (Londres)

References 

Brazilian television news shows
RedeTV! original programming